Phillip Hefferton (July 25, 1933 – April 2, 2008) was an American pop artist from Detroit, Michigan, known for his paintings of banknotes.

Artist
In 1958-9 he began drawing "common objects". In 1960 his work was featured in an Art in America article by Robert Broner on the "Young Artists Group" in Detroit. In 1960 he moved to San Francisco and began work on his first images of banknotes and in 1961 he moved to Los Angeles.

In 1962 Hefferton's work was included, along with Roy Lichtenstein, Andy Warhol, Jim Dine, Robert Dowd, Joe Goode, Edward Ruscha, and Wayne Thiebaud, in the exhibition New Painting of Common Objects, curated by Walter Hopps at the Pasadena Art Museum, the first museum survey of pop art in America.

Family life
On July 24, 1987 Phillip Hefferton met his only child, Susanne-Truth Nichole Hefferton. He was 53 and she was 22. They spent the next 21 years together. He made paintings and drawings for 50 years.

Death
Phillip Conrad Hefferton died at home of kidney cancer on April 2, 2008. He left his daughter almost 200 paintings and hundreds of drawings.

Bibliography
 Pop Art, Lucy R. Lippard, Praeger
 Pop Art Redefined, Barbara Rose, Praeger
 American Pop Art, Lawrence Alloway, Macmillan
 An Illustrated Dictionary of Pop, Jose Pierre, Barrons
 The Painter and The Photograph, Van Deren Coke, University of New Mexico Press
 The New Paintings, Udo Kulterman, Praeger
 California Art Review, Les Krantz, American References
 Who's Who in American Art, R.R. Bowker
 L.A. Pop in the Sixties, Ann Ayres, Newport Harbor Museum
 Pop; An International Perspective, Rizzoli
 Robert Broner, Young Artists Group, Art in America, January, 1960. (Illustration)
 John Coplans, New Paintings of Common Objects, Artforum, November, 1962. (Illustrations)
 Jean Lipton, Money for Money's Sake, Art in America, March, 1972.(Illustration)
 Robert Dowd, Gazette Beau Arts, February, 1973. (Illustration)
 Cash Art, Art in America, July 1988 (Illustration)
 Kristine McKenna, You're A Pop Artist, L.A. Times, April 23, 1989, Calendar Section. (Illustration)
 Zan Dubin, Pop Art Exhibition at Newport, L.A. Times, April 23, 1989.
 William Zimmer, A Look at Pop Art, Los Angeles Style, The New York Times, Sunday, April 29, 1990.
 Georgette Gouveia, These Artists Developed a Palette For Everyday images, Gannett Westchester New York, April 12, 1990.
 Janet Kopios, L.A. Pop in the Sixties is a Revelation and Delight, The Advocate and Greenwick Times, June 3, 1990. (Illustration)
 William Wilson, The Words the Things at Pomona, L.A. Times, September 5, 1990.
 Ivana Edwards, Exploring New Dimensions in Realm of the Coin, The New York Times, Sunday, November 17, 1991. (Illustration)

External links
 Two Pops, Artforum International, June 2000
askart

American pop artists
20th-century American painters
American male painters
21st-century American painters
21st-century American male artists
American contemporary painters
1933 births
2008 deaths
Artists from Detroit
20th-century American male artists